Rupert Vivian de Renzy Worker (15 April 1896 – 23 April 1989) played first-class cricket in New Zealand between 1914 and 1929. He represented New Zealand in the years before New Zealand played Test cricket.

Early career
Worker made his first-class debut when he played one match for Auckland in the 1914–15 season. After graduating from Auckland University College he became a schoolmaster. While teaching at Christchurch Boys' High School he appeared for Canterbury, playing his first game as an opening batsman in the 1919–20 season. He was the outstanding batsman in Christchurch club cricket in 1919–20, scoring 609 runs at an average of 76.12 for West Christchurch. Nobody else score more than 400 runs.

He became a regular player in the Canterbury side, but his achievements to the end of the 1922–23 season were modest: in 12 first-class matches he had made 510 runs at 22.17, with a top score of 65 (in an opening partnership of 208 with Roger Blunt) against MCC in 1922–23.

Plunket Shield record
Worker transferred to Otago Boys' High School and began playing for Otago. He began the 1923–24 Plunket Shield season with 172 and 16 against Canterbury, then scored 93 and 34 against Auckland.

In the final match, against Wellington at Carisbrook, 1905 runs were scored over five days – which is still the seventh-highest aggregate in the history of first-class cricket – and Worker set the record for most runs in a Plunket Shield season. Wellington batted first and made 560, and Otago replied with 385, Worker scoring 106 and making an opening partnership of 154 in 76 minutes with James Shepherd. When Wellington made 465 in their second innings their opening batsman Syd Hiddleston scored 150 to set a new Plunket Shield record of 505 runs in a season. The next day Worker made 94, putting on 155 with Shepherd in 85 minutes, and beating Hiddleston's record by 10 runs, but Otago, needing 641 to win, were dismissed for 495. Hiddleston reclaimed the record in the 1925–26 season, when he made 537 runs.

After the Plunket Shield season ended, a New South Wales team played two matches against New Zealand. Worker made 8 and 37 for New Zealand in the first match, and a pair in the second.

Later career
In 1924–25 Worker made 205 runs in the Plunket Shield at an average of 41.00 and played both matches for New Zealand against Victoria, scoring 33, 34, 55 and 6.

He toured Australia with a New Zealand side in 1925–26, playing all four first-class matches, but finished seventh in both aggregates and averages, with 195 runs at 27.85.

He transferred to Wellington in 1926, playing three matches in 1926–27, two in 1927–28, and one each in 1928–29 and 1929–30. His success was modest, apart from his one match in 1928–29, when he made 151 and 73, top-scoring in each innings, and Wellington beat Auckland by 37 runs.

Dick Brittenden described Worker as "a most brisk and businesslike man in nearly everything he did", and a batsman who made most of his runs on the leg side.

References

1896 births
1989 deaths
New Zealand cricketers
Pre-1930 New Zealand representative cricketers
Auckland cricketers
Canterbury cricketers
Otago cricketers
Wellington cricketers
Cricketers from Auckland
University of Auckland alumni
New Zealand schoolteachers
South Island cricketers